Philemon Dickinson (April 5, 1739February 4, 1809) was an American lawyer and politician from Trenton, New Jersey. As a brigadier general of the New Jersey militia, he was one of the most effective militia officers of the American Revolutionary War. He was also a Continental Congressman from Delaware and a United States Senator from New Jersey.

Background
Philemon Dickinson was born at "Crosiadore," near Trappe, Maryland on April 5, 1739, a younger brother of Founding Father John Dickinson. When he was one, his family moved to Delaware.  He was educated by a private tutor until he went to the University of Pennsylvania, from where he graduated in 1759. He then studied law, and was admitted to the bar, but never practiced. In 1767, Dickinson moved to Trenton to an estate called "The Hermitage".  On July 14, 1767, he married his first cousin, Mary Cadwalader (1746–1781). They had two children; Samuel (1770–1837) and Mary (1768–1822).

Military service
Dickinson served as an officer during the American Revolutionary War, rising to the rank of Major General in the New Jersey Militia.

At the beginning of the Revolutionary War in 1775 he was commissioned a colonel of the Hunterdon County militia. In 1776 he was elected as a delegate to New Jersey's Revolutionary provincial congress. In January 1777 Dickinson led 400 of his militia in a raid on a British foraging party near Somerset Court House, New Jersey, capturing about forty wagons of supplies and several prisoners. In June 1777 he was appointed major general in command of all New Jersey militia, a post he held throughout the rest of the war.

In November 1777 Dickinson led 1,400 men in a raid on Staten Island. While the attack was expected by Loyalist General Skinner and repulsed, Dickinson's party killed five and took 24 prisoners. Dickinson took several New Jersey Volunteers prisoner, including Lieutenant Jacob Van Buskirk, Lieutenant Edward Earle and Surgeon John Hammell.

Dickinson's militia took part in the Battle of Monmouth in 1778, helping obstruct the retreat of the British to New York. When his cousin John Cadwalader dueled General Thomas Conway on July 4, 1778, Dickinson was Cadwalader's second.

Post Revolution Public Service
In 1782 and 1783, he represented Delaware at the Continental Congress. In 1783-84 he was elected to the New Jersey Legislative Council from Hunterdon County where he served as Vice-President of Council both years. He was a member of the commission that selected the site for the national capital in Washington, D.C., in 1784. When William Paterson resigned from the United States Senate, Dickinson was chosen by New Jersey to finish Paterson's term. He served in the senate from November 13, 1790, to March 3, 1793.

Death
After his service in Congress, he returned to look after his estates until he died on February 4, 1809, at his home, and was buried at Friends Burying Ground in Trenton.

References

Bibliography

External links
Philemon Dickinson at The Political Graveyard

Biographical sketch at Virtualology.com (under his brother, John Dickinson)

1739 births
1809 deaths
People from Talbot County, Maryland
People of colonial Maryland
People of colonial New Jersey
American people of English descent
Continental Congressmen from Delaware
Pro-Administration Party United States senators from New Jersey
Members of the New Jersey Legislative Council
People from Kent County, Delaware
Politicians from Trenton, New Jersey
University of Pennsylvania alumni
New Jersey militiamen in the American Revolution
Militia generals in the American Revolution
Burials in New Jersey